Mary Moodley (also Aunty Mary; 1913 – October 23, 1979) was a trade unionist and anti-apartheid activist in South Africa. Moodley regularly shared her home in the black district of Wattville Township with her family and homeless people, both black and white. She was generous with the little money she had and was a "regular churchgoer."

Moodley was involved with the South African Congress of Trade Unions (SACTU), the Food and Canning Workers Union, the African National Congress (ANC), the Federation of South African Women, and a founding member of the South African Coloured People's Congress (SACPO). She was working with the Food and Canning Workers Union in the 1950s in the East Rand.

In 1963, she was banned under the order of the Suppression of Communism Act. Because of her ban, she was not allowed to participate in trade unions or attend meetings and was confined to her magisterial district in Benoni. In 1964, she was detained under the 90-Days Act. She had been helping people who had become fugitives leave South Africa. Her Ban, which was to last five years was consistently renewed and in order to go to the hospital, she had to request a permit from local authorities. She died on October 23, 1979.

See also 

 List of people subject to banning orders under apartheid

References 

South African women trade unionists
People from Benoni
South African women activists
Anti-apartheid activists
1913 births
1979 deaths